Paul Henderson (born 1943) is a Canadian former ice hockey player and member of Canada's Sports Hall of Fame.

Paul Henderson may also refer to:
Paul Henderson (sprinter) (born 1971), Australian sprinter
Paul Henderson (cricketer) (born 1974), English cricketer
Paul Henderson (soccer) (born 1976), Australian football goalkeeper
Paul Henderson (journalist) (1939–2018), winner of the 1982 Pulitzer Prize for Investigative Reporting
Paul Henderson (photojournalist) (1899–1988), African-American photojournalist for the Baltimore Afro-American newspaper
Paul Henderson (politician) (born 1962), former Chief Minister of the Australian Northern Territory
Paul Henderson (rugby union) (born 1964), New Zealand rugby union player
Paul Henderson (sailor) (born 1934), Canadian sailor and member of the Canadian Olympic Hall of Fame
Paul Henderson (basketball) (born 1956), American-French professional basketball player
Paul Henderson, lead vocalist for the 1980s Canadian band The Front